Parazinho is a municipality in the state of Rio Grande do Norte in the Northeast region of Brazil.

Its seal has a ground of a countryside with a tree, on top is a blue star, surrounding are two different type of palm trees founded in the area, on the bottom is the municipality name in a green ribbon with yellow letters. Its flag colors are green, white and blue with the seal in the middle.

See also
List of municipalities in Rio Grande do Norte

References

Municipalities in Rio Grande do Norte